Morey may refer to:

Places
Morey, village and commune in the Saône-et-Loire département of France
Morey Field or Middleton Municipal Airport, formerly known as Morey Field, a general aviation airport located in Middleton, WI, United States

Other uses
Morey letter, American political forgery
Morey Hole, pond in Plymouth, Massachusetts, United States
Morey's Piers, amusement park located in Wildwood, New Jersey, United States

People with surname Morey
Angel Morey, former Chief of Staff and Secretary of State of Puerto Rico
Daryl Morey (born 1972), American basketball executive
Morey Doner (born 1994), Canadian soccer player
Frank Morey (1840–1890), American politician
George W. Morey (1888–1965), American geochemist and physical chemist
Henry Lee Morey (1841–1902), American politician
Lloyd Morey (1886–1965), American politician
Mateu Morey (born 2000), Spanish soccer player
Peter Morey (1798–1881), American politician
Samuel Morey (1762–1843), American inventor
Sean Morey (American football) (born 1976), American football player
Sean Morey (comedian), American comedian
Robert Morey (pastor) (born 1946), American Christian apologist
Tom Morey (born 1935), American surfer and inventor
Tom Morey (politician) (1906–1980), Australian politician
Walt Morey (1907–1992), American children's author

See also
Moorey, surname
Mory (disambiguation)
Morrey, surname
Maury (disambiguation)
Morley (disambiguation)